Before the Act of Union 1707, the barons of the sheriffdom or shire of Berwick (also called the Merse) elected commissioners to represent them in the unicameral Parliament of Scotland and in the Convention of Estates. The number of commissioners was increased from two to four in 1690.

During the Commonwealth of England, Scotland and Ireland the sheriffdom was represented by one Member of Parliament in the Protectorate Parliament at Westminster. After 1708, Berwickshire returned one member to the House of Commons of Great Britain and later to the House of Commons of the United Kingdom.

List of shire commissioners

 1612: William Cockburn of Langton
 1612, 1621: Robert Swinton of that Ilk
 1625: James Cockburn of Ryslaw
 1630: Sir Patrick Hume of Polwarth
 1639, 1640–41, 1645–46, 1649–50: Sir David Home of Wedderburn
 1640–41: Sir William Cockburn of Langton
 1644–45: Sir Alexander Swinton of that Ilk
 1649, 1650, 1654–55, 1656–58, 1659–60: John Swinton of that Ilk
 1661–63: Colonel John Hume of Plandergaist 
 1661–63: Sir Robert Douglas of Blaikerstone  
 1665 convention, 1667 convention, 1669–74: Sir Robert Sinclair of Longformacus
 1665 convention, 1667 convention, 1669–74, 1689 convention, 1689–90: Sir Patrick Hume of Polwarth (ennobled 1690)
 1678 convention: Sir Roger Hog of Harcarse
 1678 (convention), 1685–86, 1689 (convention), 1689–1702: Sir Archibald Cockburn of Langton
 1681–82: John Edgar of Wedderlie 
 1690–1706: Sir John Home of Blackadder
 1690–1702, 1702–07: Sir John Swinton of that Ilk
 1702–07: Sir Robert Sinclair of Longformacus
 1702-07: Sir Patrick Home of Rentoun 
 1706–07:  Sir Alexander Campbell of Cesnock

References

See also
 List of constituencies in the Parliament of Scotland at the time of the Union

Constituencies of the Parliament of Scotland (to 1707)
Constituencies disestablished in 1707
1707 disestablishments in Scotland